The Aero A.22 was a Czechoslovakian biplane civil utility aircraft based on the Aero A.12 reconnaissance-bomber. The observer's position was replaced by seating for two passengers.

Specifications (A.22)

See also

References

Single-engined tractor aircraft
A022
Biplanes
1920s Czechoslovakian civil utility aircraft